Harold Wheeler may refer to:

Harold Alden Wheeler (1903-1996), American engineer
Harold Wheeler (musician) (born 1943), American musician

See also
Harry Wheeler (disambiguation)